The 1989 Virginia Slims of Chicago was a women's tennis tournament played on indoor carpet courts at the UIC Pavilion in Chicago, Illinois in the United States and was part of the Category 4 tier of the 1989 WTA Tour. It was the 18th edition of the tournament and was held from November 6 through November 12, 1989. Second-seeded Zina Garrison won the singles title.

Finals

Singles
 Zina Garrison defeated  Larisa Savchenko 6–3, 2–6, 6–4
 It was Garrison's 3rd singles title of the year and the 9th of her career.

Doubles
 Larisa Savchenko /  Natasha Zvereva defeated  Jana Novotná /  Helena Suková 6–4, 3–6, 6–4

References

External links
 ITF tournament edition details
 Tournament draws

Virginia Slims of Chicago
Ameritech Cup
1989 in sports in Illinois
November 1989 sports events in the United States
Virgin
1980s in Chicago
1989 in Illinois